Polypedates assamensis is a species of frogs in the family Rhacophoridae. It is endemic to Dhemaji District, Assam, India.

References

 Mathew & Sen, 2009 : Studies on little known amphibian species of north east India. Records of the Zoological Survey of India, Occasional Paper, no. 293, .
http://research.amnh.org/vz/herpetology/amphibia/Amphibia/Anura/Rhacophoridae/Rhacophorinae/Polypedates/Polypedates-assamensis

assamensis
Amphibians described in 2009
Frogs of Asia
Amphibians of India